Pleurogona is an order of tunicates which is no longer in use as it contains the same families as Stolidobranchia.

One of the more invasive species of this order is the "stalked (or leathery or solitary) sea squirt" Styela clava . Another invasive genus include the "chain sea squirts or chain tunicates" of the genus Botrylloides  and the "golden star tunicate" Botryllus schlosseri .

References

Ascidiacea
Obsolete animal taxa
Chordate orders